A mortuary is a place where dead bodies await final disposition such as  burial or cremation, and may refer more specifically to:

 Morgue, a place used for the storage of human corpses awaiting identification or removal for autopsy or respectful burial or cremation, which is commonly called a mortuary in British English
 Funeral home, a business that provides interment and funeral services, which may be referred to as a mortuary in North American English

Mortuary may also refer to:

 Mortuary (1983 American film), a 1983 American slasher film
 Mortuary (1983 Malayalam film), a 1983 Indian Malayalam film
 Mortuary (2005 film), a 2005 American zombie film
 "Mortuary" (The Simple Life episode)